The 1988–89 Segunda División B season was the 12th since its establishment. The first matches of the season were played on 3 September 1988, and the season ended in 25 June 1989.

Overview before the season
80 teams joined the league, including four relegated from the 1987–88 Segunda División and 17 promoted from the 1987–88 Tercera División. The composition of the groups was determined by the Royal Spanish Football Federation, attending to geographical criteria.

Relegated from Segunda División
Bilbao Athletic
Hércules
Granada
Cartagena

Promoted from Tercera División

Racing Ferrol
Oviedo Aficionados
Santoña
Barakaldo
Palamós
Nules
Pegaso
Gimnástica Medinense
Jaén
Algeciras
Santa Ponsa
Marino
Torrevieja
Don Benito
Calahorra
Binéfar
Tomelloso

Group 1
Teams from Asturias, Basque Country, Cantabria, Castile and Leon and Galicia.

Teams

League table

Results

Top goalscorers

Top goalkeepers

Group 2
Teams from Andorra, Aragon, Basque Country, Balearic Islands, Catalonia, La Rioja and Navarre.

Teams

League table

Results

Top goalscorers

Top goalkeepers

Group 3
Teams from Andalusia, Canary Islands, Castile and Leon, Castilla–La Mancha, Extremadura and Madrid.

Teams

League table

Results

Top goalscorers

Top goalkeepers

Group 4
Teams from Andalusia, Castilla–La Mancha, Ceuta, Melilla, Region of Murcia and Valencian Community.

Teams

League table

Results

Top goalscorers

Top goalkeepers

External links
Futbolme.com

Segunda División B seasons
3
Spain